Lindsay Davis may refer to:

 Lindsay Davis (model) (born 1985), actress/model from Entourage and the Miss Ohio pageant
 Lindsay Davis (figure skater), American figure skater

See also
 Lindsey Davis (born 1949), English novelist, known for the Falco series
 G. Lindsey Davis (born 1948), American bishop